John Coryton may refer to:

Sir John Coryton, 1st Baronet (1621–1680), MP for Cornwall, Launceston, and Callington
Sir John Coryton, 2nd Baronet (1648–1690), of the Coryton baronets, MP for Newport and Callington
Sir John Coryton, 4th Baronet (c. 1690–1739) MP for Callington

See also
Coryton (disambiguation)